The Polideportivo Gimnasia y Esgrima La Plata Víctor Nethol is an indoor facility located on 4th Street between 51st and 53rd of the city of La Plata, Buenos Aires Province. Opened in 1978, it includes gymnasiums, roller skating rink, sauna and a main sports court with capacity for 3,000 spectators. Its mainly use for training and Gimnasia y Esgrima La Plata's basketball, futsal and volleyball games, but is also used for concerts and other cultural events on which its capacity is increased to 5000.

Events

 2016 Liga Nacional de Básquet All-star game
 2016 Women's South American Volleyball Club Championship

References

Indoor arenas in Argentina
Basketball venues in Argentina
Volleyball venues in Argentina